Beard Elementary School may refer to:
 Beard Elementary School - Helotes, Texas - Northside Independent School District
 Beard Elementary School (James A. Garfield School) - Detroit - Detroit Public Schools